Ceto is an Italian comune  in Val Camonica, province of Brescia, in Lombardy.
 
The village of Ceto is bounded by other communes of Braone, Breno, Capo di Ponte, Cerveno, Cevo, Cimbergo, Daone (TN), Ono San Pietro.

History

In February 1798 the town of Nadro was united to that of Ceto, and assumed the name of "comune of Ceto and Nadro. "

Between 1816 and 1859 the town was called "Ceto with Nadro", while from 1859 to 1927 only "Ceto". In that year he was joined Cerveno, which was linked with the name "Ceto Cerveno" until 1947.

Main sights
 Church of St. Andrew the Apostle. Rebuilt on a previous building in 1700 from a design by Anthonio Spiazzi. 
 Church of Saints Faustino and Jovita.

References

External links

 Historical photos - Intercam
 Historical photos - Lombardia Beni Culturali

Cities and towns in Lombardy